The 2021–22 Thai League Cup is the 12th season in the second era of a Thailand's knockout football competition. All games are played as a single match. It was sponsored by Toyota Motor Thailand, and known as the Hilux Revo League Cup for sponsorship purposes, Hilux Revo is a truck model of Toyota. 75 clubs were accepted into the tournament, and it began with the first qualification round on 13 October 2021 and concluded with the final on 29 May 2022. The tournament has been readmitted back into Thai football after a 10-year absence. The prize money for this prestigious award is said to be around 5 million baht and the runners-up will be netting 1 million baht.

This is the first edition of the competition and the qualifying round will be played in regions featuring clubs from the Thai League 3.

Calendar

Results
Note: T1: Clubs from Thai League 1; T2: Clubs from Thai League 2; T3: Clubs from Thai League 3.

First qualification round
There were 14 clubs from 2021–22 Thai League 3 have signed to first qualifying in the 2021–22 Thai League cup. This round had drawn on 28 September 2021. There are 21 goals that occurred in this round.

Northeastern region
 The qualifying round would be played in the northeastern region featuring 4 clubs from the 2021–22 Thai League 3 Northeastern Region.

Eastern region
 The qualifying round would be played in the eastern region featuring 4 clubs from the 2021–22 Thai League 3 Eastern Region.

Western region
 The qualifying round would be played in the western region featuring 2 clubs from the 2021–22 Thai League 3 Western Region.

Southern region
 The qualifying round would be played in the southern region featuring 4 clubs from the 2021–22 Thai League 3 Southern Region.

Second qualification round
The second qualifying round would be featured 7 clubs that were the winners of the first qualification round and the new entries that were 33 clubs from the 2021–22 Thai League 3. There are 67 goals that occurred in this round.

Northern region
 The qualifying round would be played in the northern region featuring 6 clubs from the 2021–22 Thai League 3 Northern Region.

Northeastern region
 The qualifying round would be played in the northeastern region featuring 6 clubs from the 2021–22 Thai League 3 Northeastern Region.

Eastern region
 The qualifying round would be played in the eastern region featuring 8 clubs from the 2021–22 Thai League 3 Eastern Region.

Western region
 The qualifying round would be played in the western region featuring 8 clubs from the 2021–22 Thai League 3 Western Region.

Southern region
 The qualifying round would be played in the southern region featuring 6 clubs from the 2021–22 Thai League 3 Southern Region.

Bangkok metropolitan region
 The qualifying round would be played in the Bangkok metropolitan region featuring 6 clubs from the 2021–22 Thai League 3 Bangkok Metropolitan Region.

Qualification play-off round
The qualification play-off round would be featured 20 clubs that were the winners of the second qualification round and the new entries that were 12 clubs from the 2021–22 Thai League 2. This round had drawn on 21 October 2021. There are 63 goals that occurred in this round.

First round
The first round would be featured 16 clubs that were the winners of the qualification play-off round including 8 clubs from T2 and 8 clubs from T3 and the new entries that were 16 clubs from the 2021–22 Thai League 1. This round had drawn on 8 December 2021. There are 44 goals that occurred in this round.

Second round
The second round would be featured 16 clubs that were the winners of the first round including 12 clubs from T1, 1 club from T2, and 3 clubs from T3. This round had drawn on 18 January 2022. There are 27 goals that occurred in this round.

Quarter-finals
The quarter-finals would be featured 8 clubs that were the winners of the second round including 7 clubs from T1 and 1 club from T3. This round had drawn on 15 February 2022. There are 12 goals that occurred in this round.

|}

Semi-finals
The semi-finals would be featured 4 clubs that were the winners of the quarter-finals, all are clubs from T1. This round had drawn on 5 April 2022. There are 2 goals that occurred in this round.

|}

Final

The final would be featured 2 clubs that were the winners of the semi-finals, both are clubs from T1. There are 4 goals that occurred in this round.

Tournament statistics

Top goalscorers

Hat-tricks

Notes: 5 = Player scored 5 goals; (H) = Home team; (A) = Away team

See also
 2021–22 Thai League 1
 2021–22 Thai League 2
 2021–22 Thai League 3
 2021–22 Thai League 3 Northern Region
 2021–22 Thai League 3 Northeastern Region
 2021–22 Thai League 3 Eastern Region
 2021–22 Thai League 3 Western Region
 2021–22 Thai League 3 Southern Region
 2021–22 Thai League 3 Bangkok Metropolitan Region
 2021–22 Thai League 3 National Championship
 2021–22 Thai FA Cup
 2021 Thailand Champions Cup

References

External links
 Thai League official website

2021 in Thai football cups
Thailand League Cup
2021
2021
2021–22 Asian domestic association football cups